Datang may refer to:

Companies 
The word Datang (meaning grand China; Tang as a reference to the Tang dynasty) was used in several companies
China Datang Corporation: a state-owned enterprise mainly in power generation in the People's Republic of China
Datang International Power Generation Company: a state-owned enterprise in power generation, subsidiary of China Datang Corporation
Datang Telecom Group: a telecommunication equipment vendor in the People's Republic of China
 Datang Telecom Technology

Places in China 
Place with name Datang, which means big pond
Datang station (disambiguation)
Datang Subdistrict, Guangzhou, in Yuexiu District, Guangzhou
Datang Subdistrict, Wuzhou, a subdistrict in Changzhou District, Wuzhou, Guangxi
Datang Town (disambiguation)
Datang Township
Datang Township, Guidong County, Guidong County, Hunan
Datang, Jiangxi, in Yugan County, Jiangxi
Datang, Zhuji, in Zhuji, Zhejiang, also known as "Sock City"

See also
 Tang (disambiguation)